The Torneo Clausura 2007 was the football (soccer) tournament that closed the season in the Paraguayan first division in the year 2007.

The tournament began on August 3 and ended on December 2  with the participation of 12 teams, with a two-legged all play all system. The winner was Libertad, which  gained the right to play the Copa Libertadores 2008 and the national championship final against Sportivo Luqueño (winners of the 2007 Apertura.

Positions

Results

{| class="wikitable" style="text-align:center; float:left; margin-right:1em;"
|-
!colspan=3 |Matchday 1
|-
!width="170"|Home Team
!width="60"|Result
!width="170"|Away Team

{| class="wikitable" style="text-align:center; float:left; margin-right:1em;"
|-
!colspan=3 |Matchday 2
|-
!width="170"|Home Team
!width="60"|Result
!width="170"|Away Team

{| class="wikitable" style="text-align:center; float:left; margin-right:1em;"
|-
!colspan=3 |Matchday 3
|-
!width="170"|Home Team
!width="60"|Result
!width="170"|Away Team

{| class="wikitable" style="text-align:center; float:left; margin-right:1em;"
|-
!colspan=3 |Matchday 4
|-
!width="170"|Home Team
!width="60"|Result
!width="170"|Away Team

{| class="wikitable" style="text-align:center; float:left; margin-right:1em;"
|-
!colspan=3 |Matchday 5
|-
!width="170"|Home Team
!width="60"|Result
!width="170"|Away Team

{| class="wikitable" style="text-align:center; float:left; margin-right:1em;"
|-
!colspan=3 |Matchday 6
|-
!width="170"|Home Team
!width="60"|Result
!width="170"|Away Team

{| class="wikitable" style="text-align:center; float:left; margin-right:1em;"
|-
!colspan=3 |Matchday 7
|-
!width="170"|Home Team
!width="60"|Result
!width="170"|Away Team

{| class="wikitable" style="text-align:center; float:left; margin-right:1em;"
|-
!colspan=3 |Matchday 8
|-
!width="170"|Home Team
!width="60"|Result
!width="170"|Away Team

{| class="wikitable" style="text-align:center; float:left; margin-right:1em;"
|-
!colspan=3 |Matchday 9
|-
!width="170"|Home Team
!width="60"|Result
!width="170"|Away Team

{| class="wikitable" style="text-align:center; float:left; margin-right:1em;"
|-
!colspan=3 |Matchday 10
|-
!width="170"|Home Team
!width="60"|Result
!width="170"|Away Team

{| class="wikitable" style="text-align:center; float:left; margin-right:1em;"
|-
!colspan=3 |Matchday 11
|-
!width="170"|Home Team
!width="60"|Result
!width="170"|Away Team

{| class="wikitable" style="text-align:center; float:left; margin-right:1em;"
|-
!colspan=3 |Matchday 12
|-
!width="170"|Home Team
!width="60"|Result
!width="170"|Away Team

{| class="wikitable" style="text-align:center; float:left; margin-right:1em;"
|-
!colspan=3 |Matchday 13
|-
!width="170"|Home Team
!width="60"|Result
!width="170"|Away Team

{| class="wikitable" style="text-align:center; float:left; margin-right:1em;"
|-
!colspan=3 |Matchday 14
|-
!width="170"|Home Team
!width="60"|Result
!width="170"|Away Team
|-

{| class="wikitable" style="text-align:center; float:left; margin-right:1em;"
|-
!colspan=3 |Matchday 15
|-
!width="170"|Home Team
!width="60"|Result
!width="170"|Away Team

{| class="wikitable" style="text-align:center; float:left; margin-right:1em;"
|-
!colspan=3 |Matchday 16
|-
!width="170"|Home Team
!width="60"|Result
!width="170"|Away Team

{| class="wikitable" style="text-align:center; float:left; margin-right:1em;"
|-
!colspan=3 |Matchday 17
|-
!width="170"|Home Team
!width="60"|Result
!width="170"|Away Team

{| class="wikitable" style="text-align:center; float:left; margin-right:1em;"
|-
!colspan=3 |Matchday 18
|-
!width="170"|Home Team
!width="60"|Result
!width="170"|Away Team
|-

{| class="wikitable" style="text-align:center; float:left; margin-right:1em;"
|-
!colspan=3 |Matchday 19
|-
!width="170"|Home Team
!width="60"|Result
!width="170"|Away Team
|-

{| class="wikitable" style="text-align:center; float:left; margin-right:1em;"
|-
!colspan=3 |Matchday 20
|-
!width="170"|Home Team
!width="60"|Result
!width="170"|Away Team

{| class="wikitable" style="text-align:center; float:left; margin-right:1em;"
|-
!colspan=3 |Matchday 21
|-
!width="170"|Home Team
!width="60"|Result
!width="170"|Away Team

{| class="wikitable" style="text-align:center; float:left; margin-right:1em;"
|-
!colspan=3 |Matchday 22
|-
!width="170"|Home Team
!width="60"|Result
!width="170"|Away Team

Finals

First leg

Second leg

Top scorers

Transfers 
In:
  Ivan Herrera Returns from  Lota Schwager
  Ignacio Don On Loan from  Nacional
  Herminio Miranda Signed from  Nacional

Out:
  Ariel Pereyra Retired
  Cristián Muñoz Transferred to  Colo Colo
  Pedro Morales Transferred to  Universidad de Chile

See also
2007 in Paraguayan football

References

External links
Asociación Paraguaya de Fútbol Website
Paraguay 2007 at RSSSF

Claus